Southside is a census subdistrict (CSD) on Saint Thomas in the United States Virgin Islands. The CSD is bordering Charlotte Amalie from Havensight in the west, Nordside- and the Tutu subdistricts to the north, and the East End subdistrict to the east. The 2010 U.S. Census showed a population of 5,411 people, which is a decrease of 56 people as compared to the 2000 U.S. Census of 5,467. Some of the communities here includes Havensight, Bellevue, Raphune, Hoffman, Bolongo and Bovoni.  

Hotels and resorts in this region front the calmer Caribbean Sea as opposed to the Atlantic Ocean on the Northside. The sea and weather tends to stay calmer in this region as compared to the northern parts of Saint Thomas. Hotels and beach resorts in this region include Marriott Frenchman's Reef, Bluebeard's Beach Club, and Bolongo Bay Beach Resort.  

The months of January and February are the coldest here, when night temperates can reach the 60s, while it’s more commonly with winter temperatures in the 70s and summer temperatures in the 80s in this region.  

Some of the popular beaches here includes Limetree Beach (Bluebeard’s Beach), Morningstar Beach and the Beach at Bolongo Bay.  

Popular Southside restaurants include Iggies Beach Bar, in Bolongo Bay.

References